Silene  dioica (syn. Melandrium rubrum), known as red campion and red catchfly, is a herbaceous flowering plant in the family Caryophyllaceae, native throughout central, western and northern Europe, and locally in southern Europe. It has been introduced in Iceland, Canada, the US, and Argentina.

Description
It is a biennial or perennial plant, with dark pink to red flowers, each 1.8–2.5 cm across. There are five petals which are deeply notched at the end, narrowed at the base and all go into an urn-shaped calyx.  As indicated by the specific name, male and female flowers are borne on separate plants (dioecious), the male with 10 stamens and a 10-veined calyx, the female with 5 styles and a 20-veined calyx.  The fruit, produced from July onwards, is an ovoid capsule containing numerous seeds, opening at the apex by 10 teeth which curve back. The flowers are unscented. The flowering period is from May to October and the flowers are frequently visited by flies such as Rhingia campestris. The plant grows to 30–90 cm, with branching stems. The deep green leaves are in opposite and decussate pairs, simple acute ovate, 3–8 cm long with an untoothed margin; both the leaves and stems of the plant are hairy and slightly sticky. The upper leaves are stalkless.

Distribution
Silene dioica is native to northern and central Europe  and is locally abundant throughout the British Isles. It is generally common in Northern Ireland, but rare elsewhere in Ireland. The plant is common on the Isle of Man where it is known as "blaa ny ferrishyn" or "fairy flower", and has a local taboo against picking it.

Red campion grows in roadsides, woodlands, and rocky slopes.  It prefers to grow on damp, non-acid soils.

Plants of Silene latifolia × Silene dioica = Silene × hampeana that are fertile hybrids with the closely related white campion (Silene latifolia) are common in some areas. They may have paler pink flowers and be intermediate between the two species in other characters.

Disease
The flowers of red-campion along with a number of other Caryophyllaceae members, are very susceptible to a smut (fungus) infection. In this case by Microbotryum silenes-dioicae known as anther-smut which appears as a mass of brown spores in the mouth of the flower where the anthers would normally be.

Uses

This plant is used as an ornamental perennial flower for the perennial border.  One particularly notable variety is a hot pink, double flowered variety with deep green leaves called 'Firefly'.

The nectar of the flowers is utilised by bumblebees and butterflies, and several species of moth feed on the foliage.

References

dioica
Dioecious plants